Take It Like a Man may refer to:

 "Take It Like a Man" (Bachman–Turner Overdrive song)
 "Take It Like a Man" (Cher song)
 "Take It Like a Man" (Dragonette song)
 "Take It Like a Man" (Michelle Wright song)
 "Take It Like a Man", a song from the album Ignition by The Offspring.
 Take It Like a Man (Butcher Babies album)
 Take It Like a Man (Amanda Shires album)
 Take It Like a Man, an EP by Shannon Curfman
 Take It Like a Man (autobiography), by Boy George